The 1963 WANFL season was the 79th season of the various incarnations of the Western Australian National Football League.

Home-and-away season

Round 1

Ladder

Finals

Grand Final

References

External links
Official WAFL website

West Australian Football League seasons
WANFL